Bobby Sewall (born February 29, 1988) is a former American football wide receiver. He played college football at Brown University. Led by Head Coach Phil Estes, Sewall scored more points than any Ivy League player during his tenure at Brown.  As a sophomore against Dartmouth, he tallied 18 catches for 144 yards, 15 rushes for 141 yards and 4 touchdowns, and threw a 48-yard TD pass; with which he garnered National Player of the Week honors. 

At his pro day he ran an official 4.41 in the forty yard dash and recorded a vertical leap of 41.5, which he later bested in the CFL at 42.5in.

Early life
Sewall was born Robert Adelbert Sewall Jr to his parents: Cindy and Robert Sr. on February 29, 1988.  

The oldest of four, his sister Caitlin played soccer at Assumption, Megan played basketball at RIC, winning a Little East title and later graduating from NC State University. His brother, Matthew Sewall, was the Gatorade Player of the Year and currently plays wide receiver for Marty Fine at Bryant University.

Professional career

Tennessee Titans
Sewall was signed by the Titans as an undrafted free agent after the 2010 NFL Draft on April 30, 2010.

Jacksonville Sharks
Sewall joined the Jacksonville Sharks of the Arena Football League in 2011. In 2012, he was re-signed by the team.

Tampa Bay Buccaneers
On July 27, 2013, Sewall signed with the Tampa Bay Buccaneers. Sewall was waived on August 5, 2013.

Personal life 
Sewall established Sewall Financial Group Inc. in 2019, where he serves as President & Founder of a boutique wealth management firm in New York City that specializes in handling high net worth clientele. 

After his playing days, Sewall served as the President of the NFLPA NY/NJ Chapter for the maximum, two terms. He has also served as the Vice President twice, and currently is one of nine NFLPA Former Player Board of Directors, a group that is chaired by Priest Holmes. In addition to his role in the NFLPA, Sewall also is the President of his father's charity, Bob's Big Give.

References

1988 births
Living people
People from Portsmouth, Rhode Island
Players of American football from Rhode Island
American football wide receivers
Brown Bears football players
Tennessee Titans players
Jacksonville Sharks players
Tampa Bay Buccaneers players